Martin Sandberger (17 August 1911 – 30 March 2010) was a German SS functionary during the Nazi era and a convicted Holocaust perpetrator. He commanded Sonderkommando 1a of Einsatzgruppe A, as well as the Sicherheitspolizei and SD at the time of Nazi German occupation of Estonia during World War II. Sandberger perpetrated mass murder of the Jews in German-occupied Latvia and Estonia. He was also responsible for the arrest of Jews in Italy, and their deportation to Auschwitz concentration camp. Sandberger was the second-highest official of the Einsatzgruppe A to be tried and convicted. He was also the last-surviving defendant from the Nuremberg Military Tribunals.

Background and early career 
Martin Sandberger was born in Charlottenburg, Berlin as a son of a director of IG Farben. Sandberger studied law at the Universities of München, Köln, Freiburg and Tübingen.
At the age of 20 he joined the Nazi Party and the SA. From 1932 - 1933 Sandberger was a Nazi student activist and student leader in Tübingen. On 8 March 1933 Sandberger and fellow student Erich Ehrlinger raised the Nazi flag in front of the main building at the University of Tübingen. (Like Sandberger, Ehrlinger would take charge of an Einsatzkommando in 1941, and in so doing, commit thousands of murders.)

By 1935 he had obtained his doctorate degree. As a functionary of the Nazi student League he eventually became a university inspector. In 1936 he became an enlisted member of the SS and under the command of Gustav Adolf Scheel for the SD in Württemberg.

He began a career with the SD and by 1938 he had risen to the rank of SS Sturmbannführer (major). Sandberger worked as an assistant judge in the Interior Administration of Württemberg and became a government councillor in 1937.

Activities during the Second World War 

Following the German invasion and occupation of Poland in September 1939, Heinrich Himmler embarked on a program, known as Heim ins Reich (approximate translation: Return to the Nation) which involved driving out the native population in areas of Poland and replacing them with ethnic Germans (Volksdeutsche) from various countries, such as the Baltic states and Soviet-occupied eastern Poland.  On 13 October 1939 Heinrich Himmler appointed Sandberger the boss of the Northeast Central Immigration Office (Einwandererzentralstelle Nord-Ost) and tasked with the "racial valuation" (rassische Bewertung) of the various Volksdeutsche immigrants.

In June 1941 Sandberger was appointed chief of Sonderkommando 1a of Einsatzgruppe A. During the first two weeks of the German invasion of the Soviet Union, which began on 22 June 1941, Sandberger traveled with Franz Walter Stahlecker, the commander of Einsatzgruppe A. Sandberger was involved since March 1941 in the distribution of a business plan for the RSHA and a director of the curriculum organization of the schools (Lehrplangestaltung der Schulen).

Knowledge of the Führer Order 
The Nazi organization most responsible for carrying out The Holocaust in the Baltic states was the Security Service (Sicherheitsdienst), generally referred to by its initials SD. The SD, which organized the Einsatzgruppen, conducted itself in accordance with the understanding that a fundamental order, sometimes called a Führer Order (Führerbefehl) existed to kill the Jews. Sandberger received his knowledge of the Führer order from Bruno Streckenbach, an official with Department IV of the Reich Security Main Office (RSHA). According to Sandberger's testimony as an accused in the Einsatzgruppen trial after the war, Streckenbach gave a speech (at the Gestapo headquarters in Berlin on Prince Albertstrasse) about the Führer order, which Sandberger attended. Streckenbach also gave Sandberger explicit instructions in a personal conversation:

Transfer to Estonia 

Sandberger entered Riga with Einsatzkommando 1a and 2. These organizations then engaged in
destruction of synagogues, the liquidation of 400 Jews, and the setting up of groups for the purpose of fomenting pogroms. After the war, when on trial for war crimes, Sandberger's effort to evade responsibility was rejected by the tribunal: "Although it has been demonstrated that not only he was in Riga at the time they occurred, but he actually had a conversation about them with the Einsatzgruppe Chief Stahlecker before he left Riga."

In early July 1941, Sandberger was sent to Estonia on the orders of Stahlecker. According to Sandberger's later testimony, Stahlecker made it clear that Sandberger was being sent to Estonia to carry out the Führer order in that country. A variety of shooting actions of Jews, Romani, Communists and the mentally-ill began once Sandberger and his kommando entered Estonia. A report dated 15 October 1941 on executions in Ostland during Sandberger's tenure included one item under Estonia of 474 Jews and 684 Communists.

Others were arrested and sent to concentration camps. Report No. 17, dated 9 July 1941 carried the item —

On 10 September 1941, Sandberger promulgated a general order for the internment of Jews which resulted in the internment of 450 Jews in a concentration camp at Pskov, Russia. The Jews were later executed.

Sandburger was highly recommended for promotion in the SS:

On 3 December 1941 he became commander of the Security Police and SD for Estonia.

Actions in Italy 
Sandberger returned to Germany in September 1943. In the fall of 1943, Sandberger was appointed the Gestapo chief for the Italian city of Verona. In this capacity he was involved in arresting the Jews of Northern Italy and organizing their transportation to Auschwitz concentration camp.

Espionage activity 
In January 1944 Sandberger became head of the Department A in the Reich Security Main Office Amt. VI (Ausland-SD, the foreign intelligence service); in this position he reported directly to Walter Schellenberg. He kept the domestic and foreign accounts and financial records of the organization. As the first assistant to Schellenberg, Sandberger acted as his liaison man with Heinrich Himmler.

With all the access he had had to highly secret information, after the war, under British interrogation, Sandberger tried to delay or avoid prosecution by disclosing what he knew. Until internal reports of the Einsatzgruppen were discovered, Sandberger was able to convince the British interpreters that his account of his activities in Tallinn as the Kommandeur der Sicherheitspolizei (or KdS) had involved "'no evidence of any particular criminal actions on his part.'"

Trial 
In the Einsatzgruppen trial, Sandberger was charged with crimes against humanity, war crimes, and membership in a criminal organization, that is, the SS. At his trial, Sandberger denied responsibility for the killings described in the 15 October report and sought to blame the German field police and Estonian home guard. This was rejected by the tribunal, which found that the Estonian home guard was under Sandberger's jurisdiction and control for specific operations, as shown by the same report. Similarly, Sandberger claimed he had arrested the Jews sent to Pskov to protect them, hoping that during the internment the Führer order might be revoked or meliorated and he was not in general responsible for their execution at the Pskov detention camp. Sandberger said he was responsible for "only a fraction" of the killings. Sandberger estimated this "fraction" at 300 to 350 persons.

Sandberger claimed the execution of the Jews at Pskov happened in his absence and without his knowledge. The tribunal found that Sandberger's own testimony convicted him:

Sandberger testified that he had protested against the inhumanity of the Führer order, but his account was not accepted by the Nuremberg Military Tribunal which was conducting the trial: "Despite the defendant's protestations from the witness stand, it is evident from the documentary evidence and his own testimony, that he went along willingly with the execution of the Fuehrer Order."

Death sentence and reprieve 
Sandberger was found guilty on all counts. In September 1947,
Judge Michael Musmanno pronounced the tribunal's sentence:

Despite political pressures, General Lucius D. Clay confirmed Sandberger's death sentence in 1949. In 1951, Sandberger's sentence was later commuted to life imprisonment by the "Peck Panel" clemency board acting under the authority of John J. McCloy, the U.S. High Commissioner for Germany. McCloy had received political pressure to grant the reprieve from William Langer, U.S. Senator from North Dakota. Many of Langer's constituents were of German descent, and Langer felt that trial of anyone other than the highest Nazis was contrary to American legal tradition and helped Communism.

Sandberger's father, a retired production director of IG Farben, used his connections with West German president Theodor Heuss. Heuss in turn contacted the US Ambassador at that time James B. Conant with the request for pardon. Numerous pleas for leniency from influential individuals including Minister of Justice Wolfgang Haußmann and Landesbischof (bishop) Martin Haug were made. The renowned lawyer and vice-president of the West German parliament Carlo Schmid worried about Sandberger's conditions in Landsberg Prison and spoke out in favor of a commutation. Over time these and other well-connected people lobbied for Sandberger's early release. By late 1957, there were only four war criminals held in prison in West Germany. One of them was Sandberger. He had been denied parole several times. In 1958 the Federal Foreign Office filed parole applications on the behalf of all four inmates still serving time in Landsberg Prison. Sandberger was denied parole, but the board unanimously voted for his life sentence and that of the other three to be commuted to time served. The commutations became official on 6 May 1958, and Sandberger was released three days later. Subsequently, through the mediation of Bernhard Müller, he received a position as legal counsel in the Lechler Group. Until 1972, Sandberger was repeatedly called as a witness in Nazi war crimes trials, such as in 1958 in the trial against the "Einsatzkommando Tilsit", the so-called Einsatzgruppen trial, in Ulm. A prosecution by the public prosecutor's offices in Munich (1962) and Stuttgart (1971/72) for his responsibility for the "shooting of numerous persons, including communists, Jews and parachutists in the years 1941 – 1943" (investigation of the public prosecutor's office at the Regional Court of Stuttgart in June 1971, p. 1 – the group of Romani is not mentioned here) was discontinued. The reason was that Sandberger had already been convicted in 1948 in the trial before the International Military Tribunal in Nuremberg. This excludes prosecution by German judicial authorities in accordance with the 1955 Treaty on the Regulation of Questions of War and Occupation, the so-called Transition Treaty(see Bundesarchiv B 162/5199 p. 26). Sandberger died on 30 March 2010, at the age of 98.

Notes

References

Historiographical 
  Birn, Ruth Bettina: Die Sicherheitspolizei in Estland 1941-1944. Eine Studie zur Kollaboration im Osten. Ferdinand Schöningh, Paderborn 2006, .
 Breitman, Richard, and Goda, Norman, U.S. intelligence and the Nazis, Cambridge University Press 2005 
 Conclusions of the Estonian International Commission for the Investigation of Crimes Against Humanity
 Ezergailis, Andrew, The Holocaust in Latvia 1941-1944—The Missing Center, Historical Institute of Latvia (in association with the United States Holocaust Memorial Museum) Riga 1996 
  Frei, Norbert: "Vergangenheitspolitik. Die Anfänge der Bundesrepublik Deutschland und die NS-Vergangenheit", München 1996, 
 Kahn, David, Hitler's spies
  Klee, Ernst: „Martin Sandberger" Eintrag in ders.: Das Personenlexikon zum Dritten Reich. Wer war was vor und nach 1945. Aktualisierte Ausgabe. Fischer-Taschenbuch, Frankfurt am Main 2005, S. 43
  Ruck, Michael: Korpsgeist und Staatsbewußtsein. Beamte im deutschen Südwesten 1928 bis 1972. Oldenbourg, München 1996, 
 Smelser, Ronald M., and Davies, Edward J., The Myth of the Eastern Front, Cambridge University Press 2007 
  Wildt, Michael Wildt: Generation der Unbedingten – Das Führungskorps des Reichssicherheitshauptamtes. Hamburger Edition, Hamburg 2003, .

War crimes trials and evidence 
 Stahlecker, Franz W., "Comprehensive Report of Einsatzgruppe A Operations up to 15 October 1941", Exhibit L-180, translated in part and reprinted in Office of the United States Chief of Counsel For Prosecution of Axis Criminality, Nazi Conspiracy and Aggression, Volume VII, pages 978–995, USGPO, Washington DC 1946 ("Red Series")
 Trials of War Criminals before the Nuernberg Military Tribunals under Control Council Law No. 10, Nuernberg, October 1946 - April 1949, Volume IV, ("Green Series) (the "Einsatzgruppen case") also available at Mazel library (well indexed HTML version)

External links

 "The Quiet Death of a Nazi." ABC News. 15 April 2010.
  Biography and image of Sandberger
  Jost Nolte von, "Das Lächeln der SS: Der Fall des Lektors Hans Rößner und andere Fälle: Wie Täter mit gutem Benehmen nach 1945 durchs Netz schlüpften", June 2002 (English: "The Smiling SS: The cases of lecturer Hans Rossner and others: How Perpetrators Slipped through the Net on good behavior")
  Vorlesung von Prof. Michael Wildt über die Tübinger Exekutoren der Endlösung (Sandberger u.a.) Videoaufzeichnung

1911 births
2010 deaths
Einsatzgruppen personnel
German prisoners sentenced to death
Holocaust perpetrators in Italy
Holocaust perpetrators in Lithuania
Holocaust perpetrators in Estonia
Holocaust perpetrators in Latvia
Holocaust perpetrators in Russia
Nazi Party officials
People convicted by the United States Nuremberg Military Tribunals
Prisoners sentenced to death by the United States military
SS-Standartenführer
People from Charlottenburg
Nazis convicted of war crimes
German people convicted of crimes against humanity
Reich Security Main Office personnel
Lawyers in the Nazi Party
Jurists from Berlin